Halidesmus is a genus of ray-finned fishes, the type genus of the subfamily Congrogadinae, the eel blennies, part of the dottyback family, Pseudochromidae. They are found in the western Indian Ocean as far east as India, with one species extending marginally into the south-east Atlantic Ocean.

Species
The following species are classified in the genus Halidesmus:

 Halidesmus coccus Winterbottom & Randall, 1994 (Rooster snakelet)
 Halidesmus polytretus Winterbottom, 1982
 Halidesmus scapularis Günther, 1872 (Snakelet )
 Halidesmus socotraensis Gill & Zajonz, 2003 (Socotran snakelet)
 Halidesmus thomaseni (Nielsen, 1961) (Thomasen's snakelet)

References

Congrogadinae
Taxa named by Albert Günther